Elko station is a train station in Elko, Nevada. It is served by Amtrak's California Zephyr.

The westbound platform is accessed from Water Street via 11th Street and the eastbound platform is accessed from Sharp Access Road via 12th Street (Water Street cannot be accessed directly from 12th Street). The station is owned by the Union Pacific Railroad and contains two enclosed shelters on two platforms, one on each side of the pair of tracks for each direction of travel. There are no services provided at the station (e.g., ticketing, restrooms, lounge, etc.).

History
Originally Elko was served by two train depots along two separate lines that ran through the down town area.  As the two lines were operated in a directional running setup, westbound trains used the Southern Pacific Railroad (SP) depot at 684 Railroad Street and eastbound trains used the Western Pacific Railroad (WP) depot at the corner of 3rd street and Silver street. In the 1980s both railroad tracks were relocated south of the downtown area and the current shelters became the Amtrak depots in 1984.

Notes

References

External links

Elko Amtrak Station (USA RailGuide - TrainWeb)
Amtrak Photo Archive: Current Appearance Older Picture

Amtrak stations in Nevada
Buildings and structures in Elko County, Nevada
Former Southern Pacific Railroad stations in Nevada
Former Western Pacific Railroad stations
Transportation in Elko County, Nevada
Elko, Nevada
Railway stations in the United States opened in 1984